Nihal Mansoor (born 14 November 1993) is a Pakistani cricketer. He made his first-class debut for Pakistan Television in the 2017–18 Quaid-e-Azam Trophy on 26 September 2017. He made his Twenty20 debut for Rawalpindi in the 2018–19 National T20 Cup on 23 December 2018. In March 2019, he was named in Federal Areas' squad for the 2019 Pakistan Cup.

References

External links
 

1993 births
Living people
Pakistani cricketers
Pakistan Television cricketers
Rawalpindi cricketers
Place of birth missing (living people)